Foa's red colobus (Piliocolobus foai) or the Central African red colobus, is a species of red colobus monkey found in the Democratic Republic of the Congo.

Taxonomy
Several other species of red colobus were formerly considered subspecies of Piliocolobus foai by at least some authors but have since been elevated to full species.  These include:

 Lang's red colobus (P. langi)
Ulindi River red colobus (P. lulindicus)
 Oustalet's red colobus (P. oustaleti)
 Lomami red colobus (P. parmentieri)
 Tana River red colobus (P. rufomitratus)
 Semliki red colobus (P. semlikiensis)
 Ugandan red colobus (P. tephrosceles)

It was previously thought that Foa's red colobus was made of two formerly separate species, one originally from highlands and the other originally from lowlands, which interbred into a single species. The highland species has since been split into P. foai sensu stricto, while the lowland species has been split into P. lulindicus.

Distribution
Foa's red colobus is known only from two widely separated regions in the Itombwe Mountains of the Democratic Republic of the Congo. It likely once had a larger range throughout the Albertine Rift in the past, but past deforestation in the area is thought to have led to a major range contraction.

Description
Foa's red colobus has long red and black fur on its back and head, with light underparts. It has smaller teeth than most other red colobus species.

Behavior
Foa's red colobus is arboreal and diurnal.  It has a varied diet which includes leaves, buds, fruit and flowers.  It is frequently hunted for bushmeat.

References

Foa's red colobus
Mammals of the Democratic Republic of the Congo
Endemic fauna of the Democratic Republic of the Congo
Foa's red colobus
Taxa named by Eugène de Pousargues